Lindleyspoort Dam is a concrete arch type dam located on the Elands River, near Swartruggens, North West, South Africa. It was established in 1943 and has been renovated in 1968. The main purpose of the dam is to serve for irrigation and its hazard potential has been ranked high (3).

See also
List of reservoirs and dams in South Africa
List of rivers of South Africa

References 

 List of South African Dams from the Department of Water Affairs and Forestry (South Africa)

Dams in South Africa
Buildings and structures in North West (South African province)
Dams completed in 1943